The Creating International Banking Act of 1978 was a United States legislative act that brought all American branches of foreign banks and agencies under the jurisdiction of US banking regulations.  It granted FDIC insurance to these domestic branches, but also required them to hold the same reserves and auditing schedules as US banks.

Prior to this act, foreign banks operating in the US were subject to varying state laws with no uniformity.  Thus for the benefit of both US regulators and foreign institutions seeking uniformity and stability, this act was approved.  This act required foreign banks to apply for charters and approvals to operate within the United States from the Federal Reserve. Once approved, they next must meet the required reserve ratios with FDIC standards and is subject to US accounting and regulatory standards.  This act allows foreign banks to establish branches within the United States that operate lawfully and under the same rules as domestic banks.

References

External links
 International Banking Act of 1978 as amended (PDF/details) in the GPO Statute Compilations collection
Public Law 95-369, 95th Congress, H.R. 10899: International Banking Act of 1978

Federal Deposit Insurance Corporation
United States federal banking legislation